Eastwood Park may refer to:

 Eastwood Park Historic District, a district in Minot, North Dakota, USA
 Eastwood Park, Essex, a town in Essex, England
 Eastwood Park (HM Prison), a prison in South Gloucestershire, England.
 Eastwood Park, a small park in Hasland, Chesterfield, England.
 Eastwood Park, a park in Giffnock, Scotland